The Apostolic Nunciature to Great Britain is a diplomatic office of the Holy See in Great Britain. It is headed by the Apostolic Nuncio who has the rank of an ambassador. The parties agreed to exchange representatives at the ambassadorial level and Pope John Paul II erected the Nunciature to Great Britain on 17 January 1982. Before then, the interests of the Holy See in Great Britain had been represented by an Apostolic Delegate since 1938, though not granted diplomatic status until 1979. The decision to designate the nuncio to Great Britain rather than the United Kingdom reflected the complex and frequently antagonistic relationship between the Holy See and the British crown since they severed ties in the sixteenth century. British government sources said it had been agreed that the nuncio in London would concern himself with matters in England, Scotland and Wales, while the Apostolic Nuncio to Ireland, based in Dublin, would have within his purview the entire island of Ireland.

The office of the nunciature is in London, located in Wimbledon, at 54 Parkside, lying within the Archdiocese of Southwark and overlooking Wimbledon Common. It was the only diplomatic mission in London located south of the river Thames until the United States Embassy opened its new premises in Vauxhall in 2018. The Nuncio to Great Britain is also the papal representative to Gibraltar.

The office of nuncio will become vacant once the current incumbent takes up his new duties in mid-January 2023 in Rome.

History

Formal diplomatic relations between the United Kingdom and the Holy See resumed in 1914 and an Apostolic Delegation to Great Britain was established on 21 November 1938. The Apostolic Delegation to Great Britain was promoted to the rank of an Apostolic Nunciature by Pope John Paul II in 1982.

List of office holders

See also
List of diplomatic missions of the Holy See
List of Ambassadors from the United Kingdom to the Holy See
Holy See–United Kingdom relations
54 Parkside

References

External links
  

Catholic Church in England
Catholic Church in England and Wales
Lists of ambassadors to the United Kingdom
Holy See
 
Holy See–United Kingdom relations
Great Britain
Buildings and structures in Wimbledon, London